Kewa may refer to:

Kewa (plant), a genus of plants belonging to the family Kewaceae, formerly placed in Hypertelis, Molluginaceae
 Kéwa, a rural commune of the Cercle of Djenné in the Mopti Region of Mali
 Kewa language of Papua New Guinea
 Kewa Pueblo, New Mexico, an Indian pueblo in Sandoval County, New Mexico, in the United States